Oleh Borysovych Rybachuk  (Ukrainian: Олег Борисович Рибачук), born 22 April 1958 in the village of Pohrebyshche, in Vinnytsia Oblast — Ukrainian politician and public figure.

Biography 
Oleh Rybachuk graduated from the Faculty of Philology of Taras Shevchenko National University of Kyiv (1975-1980) with a degree in English and French languages and earned the second higher education diploma at the Finance and Credit Faculty of Kyiv National Economic University (1993-1996) with a qualification in economics. In 1997, studied at the Georgetown University School of Foreign Service United States.

Career 

 From 1980 to 1986 worked as an Inspector and a Senior Inspector at the Kyiv Customs.
 In 1986 - 1991 employed as an English translator at TO "Zakordonnaftobud" in the Republic of India.
 In 1992 — Head of the Department of foreign exchange transactions at Kyiv Joint Stock Commercial Exchange Bank «Kyyivbirzhbank».
 From 1992 to 1999 served as Chief of the Foreign Relations Department, Head of the International Banking Relations Department, Director of the International Relations Department of the National Bank of Ukraine.
 In 1999-2001 served as the Head of Prime Minister's Office in the Secretariat of Cabinet of Ministers of Ukraine.
 In 2001-2002 — Vice-President of the Black Sea Trade and Development Bank (Thessaloniki, Greece).
 In April 2002 was elected a Member of Parliament of Ukraine (4th convocation) from the Viktor Yushchenko Bloc «Our Ukraine» and served through March 2005. As an MP was appointed the Head of the Parliamentary group “Together” of the “Our Ukraine” fraction, as well as the authorized representative of the fraction, the Head of the Subcommittee on Banking and Currency Regulation of the Committee on Finance and Banking. Headed the service of the leader of «Our Ukraine» Bloc and the presidential candidate Viktor Yushchenko.
 From February 4 till September 7, 2005 — Deputy Prime Minister of Ukraine on European Integration.
 From September 7, 2005 to September 16, 2006 appointed the State Secretary of Ukraine, the Chief of Staff to the President of Ukraine Viktor Yushchenko.
 In May–October 2006 — the Secretary of the Political Council under the President of Ukraine.
 From October 2005 to September 2006 was a member of the National Security and Defense Council of Ukraine.
 In September 2006 appointed an Advisor to the President of Ukraine.
 From December 2007 – non-staff Advisor to the President of Ukraine.
 On March 4, 2008 was exempt from duties of the presidential advisor after his public statement, that the Chief of Staff to the President of Ukraine Viktor Baloha does not always present the opinion of the President.
 2006 - 2008 — Chairman of the Supervisory Council of JSC "Oschadbank”. Member of the Supervisory Council of JSC “Ukreximbank”.
 From December 2008 to May 2016 — member of the Supervisory Council of PJSC "ArcelorMittal Kryvyi Rih".
 From 2009 – until now — Chairman and co-founder of the NGO «Centre UA», also one of the initiators of the «New Citizen» Public Campaign, the Civil movement "Chesno", the coalition of civil society organizations "Reanimation Package of Reforms". Co-founder of the think tank "Collegium of Anna Yaroslavna".

Euromaidan 
According to PandoDaily's investigation, which was initially based on Marcy Wheeler's speculations, Oleh Rybachuk's New Citizen, “Center UA”, “Chesno,”, “Stop Censorship” and several others interlocked organisations were financed by Pierre Omidyar via USAID. The Financial Times claimed that the former had “played a big role in getting the protest up and running.”

Accusation for special services work 
Due to the information of The Washington Times anonymous source within the British intelligence, published in November 2018, Rybachuk was an agent of the Soviet and later Russian Main intelligence directorate (GRU). Rybachuk himself doesn't deny contacts with KGB during the Soviet times. He told about them in the end of 2017 in an interview, explaining that in the Soviet Union there was no possibility to work abroad with no special services connection all the while. He disowns his accusation for the Russian special services performance and says that the respective information diffusion in Ukrainian news media is a special-order campaign designed by the Executive Office of the President against him.

See also 
Svitlana Zalishchuk

References 

Facebook page

 Russian hybrid warfare in Ukraine
 Рибачук: Я працював з радянськими спецслужбами
 Агентом якої спецслужби є Олег Рибачук?

External links 
 Dovidka.com.ua
 Blog at NovoeVremia

1958 births
Living people
People from Pohrebyshche
Taras Shevchenko National University of Kyiv alumni
Ukrainian bankers
Vice Prime Ministers of Ukraine
Fourth convocation members of the Verkhovna Rada
European integration ministers of Ukraine
Head of the Presidential Administration of Ukraine
Our Ukraine (political party) politicians
Ukrainian democracy activists